Manuel Huete Aguilar (1922 - 1999)  was a comic artist and Spanish actor.

Biography 
He is the father of the producer Cristina Huete and the costume designer Lala Huete, and grandfather of the screenwriter and director Jonás Trueba. During the 1940s he worked as a cartoonist of adventure and science fiction comics for Ediciones Rialto, Ediciones Marisal and Ediciones Maravillas, edited by Falange Española de las JONS. In 1986 he participated in the script of The year of lights  and since the 70s he collaborated in some films as a supporting actor, such as in  Sal gorda (1984) or' 'The Court of Pharaoh(1985). In 1990, he was nominated for Goya for best supporting actor for his portrayal in The flight of the dove.The flight of the dove on the Goya Awards website He died in Madrid on January 18, 1999 at the age of 77, being cremated in the funeral home of the Almudena Cemetery.

 Filmography 
Filmography is as follows:
 Sal gorda (1984) 
 La corte de Faraón (1985) 
 Hay que deshacer la casa (1986)
 El año de las luces (1986)
 Pasodoble (1988)
 Miss Caribe (1988)
 El vuelo de la paloma (1989)
 El baile del pato (1989)
 Bajarse al moro (1989)
 Belle Époque (1992)
 Suspiros de España (y Portugal)'' (1995)

References

1922 births
1999 deaths
Spanish film actors
Male actors from Madrid